Rachel Albeck-Gidron (Hebrew: רחל אַלבֶּק-גדרוֹן; born 1960) is an Israeli inter-disciplinary researcher of  Hebrew and comparative literature, philosophy and art.

Research
In her book, The Century of the Monads, Albeck-Gidron claims that there is a deep similarity and even a relationship between monadic metaphysics and the basic assumptions of modernistic thought. This claim is demonstrated in 20th-century scientific thought patterns, in the central movements in plastic art from the end of the 19th century to the beginning of the 20th century and, particularly, in the world view of the stream-of-consciousness novel.

She also developed a theoretical model of describing  the process of creation of  textual-versions and created a method of comparing between them, named 'the third text'.

Albeck-Gidron examines the Ashkenazi Pronunciation of Hebrew as a Postmodernistic Question, in a part of a sociological discussion in a problem known as 'invention of tradition'. She has also analyzed the work of Yoel Hoffmann in the light of western and eastern poetics.

Albeck-Gidron is Associate professor of Hebrew literature at Bar Ilan University in Israel.
In 2007, she has been appointed as visiting associate professor at Stanford University and taught the course "East West East in Israeli Literature: The Novels of Yoel Hoffmann".

Albeck-Gidron studied realistic painting with painter Israel Hershberg at the Jerusalem Studio School in Jerusalem.

Selected publications
Shamanism and Literary Criticism, Jerusalem: Magnes Press, 2021.
Exploring the Third Option: A Critical Study of Yoel Hoffmann's Works, Beer Sheva: Heksherim, Ben Gurion University of The Negev, Kineret, Zmora-Bitan, Dvir Press, 2016 .
The Century of the Monads: Leibniz's Metaphysics and 20th-Century Modernity, Bar-Ilan University Press.
"Totem and blindness in Israel 2001: Cultural selection procedures presented in A.B. Yehoshua's novel 'The Liberated Bride' ", Mikan 4 (January 2005), pp. 5–19.
"The draft renounced by history: Appelfeld’s 'Journey into Winter' and the radiance of Noah’s Ark as a healing discourse", Mikan 5 (2005), pp. 57–67.
"Exiled and Suppressed Voices: On the Ashkenazi Pronunciation of Hebrew as a Postmodernistic Question",Jerusalem Studies in Hebrew Literature xix (2003), pp. 69–90.

References

External links
The homepage of Albek-Gidron at Bar-Ilan university
"Exiled and Suppressed Voices: On the Ashkenazi Pronunciation of Hebrew as a Postmodernistic Question".
 [Review of] Rachel Albeck-Gidron: 'Exploring the Third Option', A Critical Study of Yoel Hoffmann's Works', Haaretz, Tarbut veSifrut (4 June 2016), "השלישי האפשרי": ניסיון לפצח את החידה ההופמנית 
"Totem and blindness in Israel 2001: Cultural selection procedures presented in A.B. Yehoshua's novel 'The Liberated Bride' "
Mekablim Shabat with Dov Elboim מקבלים שבת עם דב אלבוים - פרשת "בחוקותיי" אורחת: ד"ר רחל אלבק גדרון | כאן 11 לשעבר רשות השידור

1960 births
20th-century Israeli philosophers
21st-century Israeli philosophers
Academic staff of Bar-Ilan University
Israeli Jews
Israeli women philosophers
Jewish philosophers
Living people
Philosophers of art
Philosophy writers
21st-century Israeli non-fiction writers
21st-century Israeli women writers